Langley is an unincorporated community in the census-designated place of McLean in Fairfax County, Virginia, United States. Langley is often used as a metonym for the Central Intelligence Agency (CIA), as it is home to its headquarters, the George Bush Center for Intelligence. The land which makes up Langley today once belonged to Thomas Lee, former Crown Governor of the Colony of Virginia from 1749 to 1750. Lee's land was named Langley in honor of Langley Hall, which was part of the Lee home estate in Shropshire, England. In 1839,  of land was purchased by Benjamin Mackall from the Lee family, while keeping the name.

The community was essentially absorbed into McLean many years ago, although there is still a Langley High School. In addition to being a bedroom community for Washington, D.C. and home to the CIA's headquarters, the area is the site of the Turner-Fairbank Highway Research Center of the Federal Highway Administration and the Claude Moore Colonial Farm of the National Park Service.

In popular culture
In the animated series American Dad!, the city of Langley Falls, Virginia, in which the show takes place, is loosely based on Langley, being depicted as a somewhat larger city as well as the headquarters of the CIA, where main character Stan Smith works as an agent.

"Weird Al" Yankovic's song "Party in The CIA" starts with the line "I moved out to Langley recently".

See also
 Quantico, Virginia

References

External links
 "Why Is It Named Langley, Virginia?"—Ghosts of DC history blog

McLean, Virginia
Unincorporated communities in Fairfax County, Virginia
Unincorporated communities in Virginia
Virginia populated places on the Potomac River
Washington metropolitan area